Hamasdegh (also Hamastegh), born Hambartsum Gelenian (26 November 1895, Kharpert, Western Armenia, Ottoman Empire – 26 November 1966, New York City) was a poet and writer of the Armenian diaspora.

Biography 

Hamastegh (born Hambardzum Gelenian) was born in Perjench village of Kharbert on November 26, 1895. He received his primary education in the village school and continued his studies in the Central School of Mezire (now Elâzığ), where he was one of the founders of provincial literature and one of the students of the writer Tlkatintsi (Yovhannes Haroutionian), a victim of the Armenian Genocide.

After graduating in 1911, Hamastegh taught for a year in his hometown and then immigrated to the United States, following his father's advice. He attended courses at Columbia University (New York) and Boston University. He started working for "Hayrenik" daily in 1918, adopting the pen name Hamastegh, combining the first syllables of the names of the three Gelenian brothers (Hambardzum, Asatur, Yeghia).

In 1920, he was in New York for a year, where he first met and then became close to Shirvanzade. Later, in 1930, he became close to Isahakyan in Paris, who had just left Soviet Armenia.

Among the well-known works of Hamastegh are the collections of stories “The village” (Armenian: «Գյուղը», Romanized: "Gyughy") and "The rain" (Armenian: «Անձրեւը», Romanized: “Andzrevy”), which describe the Armenian village with its unique past and images. Other works include the novel "The White Horseman" and the satirical short stories entitled "Courageous Nazar," the drama "The Trumpeter of the Mountains of Armenia," and the "First Love" novel.

On November 26, 1966, in Los Angeles, at the solemn evening dedicated to his seventieth birthday, Hamastegh died suddenly at the podium. Buried in Boston.

References

External links
Hamastegh
A conference dedicated to Hamasdegh
Hamastegh (in Armenian)

1895 births
1966 deaths
Armenians from the Ottoman Empire
Emigrants from the Ottoman Empire to the United States
American people of Armenian descent
Armenian-language writers
American writers
People from Elazığ